Yang Xinfang (Mandarin pronunciation: jáŋ ɕīnfāŋ) is a former badminton player from China. 

Xinfang is a national coach and head coach of Guangzhou Badminton Team. Her journey of playing career originated from Elementary School. She was encouraged by her physical education teacher and with that gradually fell in love with the sport of badminton. Her major achievement at the international stage were the two bronze medals in World championships, after which she joined the coaching career.

Achievements

World Championships

IBF World Grand Prix 
The World Badminton Grand Prix sanctioned by International Badminton Federation (IBF) from 1983 to 2006.

International tournaments

References 
 

Badminton players from Guangdong
Living people
20th-century births
Chinese female badminton players
Year of birth missing (living people)